Anacleto is a given name. Notable people with the name include:

Tanya Anacleto (1976–2003), retired Mozambican swimmer who specialized in sprint freestyle events
Anacleto Angelini (1914–2007), Italian born, Chilean businessman
Juan Anacleto Araneta (1852–1924), pioneer sugar farmer and revolutionary leader during the Negros Revolution
Anacleto Díaz (1878–1945), Filipino jurist who served as an Associate Justice of the Supreme Court
Anacleto González Flores (1888–1927), Mexican Catholic layman and lawyer, executed under the presidency of Plutarco Elías Calles
José Anacleto Montt Goyenechea (1802–1867), Chilean politician and lawyer
Anacleto Jiménez (born 1967), retired Spanish long-distance runner
Francisco Anacleto Louca (born 1956), Portuguese economist and politician
Anacleto del Rosario (1860–1895), leading chemist in the Philippines during the Spanish era

See also
Anacleto, agente secreto (Anacleto, Secret Agent), a Spanish comic character created by cartoonist Manuel Vázquez Gallego in 1964
Anacleto se divorcia, 1950 Mexican film
Estádio Anacleto Campanella, an association football stadium in São Caetano do Sul, São Paulo, Brazil
Anacleto Formation, a geologic formation with outcroppings in the Argentine Patagonian provinces of Mendoza, Río Negro, and Neuquén

Spanish masculine given names

es:Anacleto